Lewis and Clark Public School District 161 is a school district headquartered in Berthold, North Dakota. The district is named after Lewis and Clark.

It operates two schools: Berthold Public School and NSP Public School, the latter in Plaza and serving Plaza and North Shore.

History
The district formed on July 1, 2003 from the merger of the Berthold, North Shore, and Plaza school districts. In Berthold, the vote to approve the merger was 167-35. In North Shore, the vote was 178-64. In Plaza, the vote was 146-2. The North Shore district was based in Makoti.

In 2011 residents of northern McLean County and southern Ward County requested to the state that it re-assign  of land, or 125 sections of land, from Lewis and Clark to the Max School District.

Area
The district has  of territory. In Ward County the district serves Berthold, Makoti, much of Carpio, and a section of Ryder. Within Mountrail County it serves Plaza.

It also serves sections of McLean County and Renville County.

References

External links
 Lewis and Clark Public School District
School districts in North Dakota
Education in McLean County, North Dakota
Education in Mountrail County, North Dakota
Education in Renville County, North Dakota
Education in Ward County, North Dakota
2003 establishments in North Dakota
Educational institutions established in 2003